Stigmella thuringiaca is a moth of the family Nepticulidae. It is found from Germany, Poland and central Russia to the Iberian Peninsula and Italy. It is not found on the Balkan Peninsula.

The larvae feed on Agrimonia eupatoria, Filipendula, Fragaria moschata, Fragaria vesca, Fragaria viridis, Potentilla tabernaemontani and Sanguisorba minor. They mine the leaves of their host plant. The mine consists of a gradually widening, relatively broad corridor, generally following a thick vein or the margin. The frass is irregularly scattered, occupying at least one third of the width of the corridor.

External links
Fauna Europaea
bladmineerders.nl

Nepticulidae
Moths of Europe
Moths described in 1904